TREM1, a triggering receptor expressed on myeloid cells 1, a human gene
 TREM2, a triggering receptor expressed on myeloid cells 2, a human gene
 Trem Desportivo Clube
 Trem da Alegria, children musical band in Brazil
 Trem das Onze, classical samba composition by Brazilian singer Adoniran Barbosa
 Tremulous, a popular free and open source FPS video game.
 Trace rare-earth element
 The highest point of the Suva Planina mountain range in Serbia
 Trem (village), a village in Hitrino Municipality, Shumen Province, Bulgaria.